Arthur Baker–Clack was an Australian-born painter in the impressionist school. He was at the art colony at Étaples, Pas-de-Calais, Nord-Pas-de-Calais, France from 1910, and continued to live in the region during World War I and after.

Career
He was a tutor at Conmurra Station, Kingston SE, South Australia.

He was a journalist at The Register before moving to the Perth Morning Herald covering the Western Australian goldfields.

He exhibited in Paris, London and Australia and was a jury member for the Salon d'Automne and of the Société Nationale des Beaux-Arts. He was also chairman of the Folkestone Art Society.

Personal
He lived in Étaples with his wife, Edith, however their house was destroyed during World War I. After the war they built a residence at Etaples, 'Bendlebi'. Edith had been his nurse during a period of illness.

Education
Mr. James Ashton's Art Academy, in Adelaide and at Way College, Wayville, South Australia (1899–1900)

He also trained in London and Paris and with Rupert Bunny at Étaples.

References

1877 births
1955 deaths
Australian Impressionist painters
Australian expatriates in France